Roel Coumans (born 23 August 1970) is a Dutch football manager. He is the current manager of Saudi Arabian club Abha.

Career
Coumans started his managerial career as assistant manager of Dutch second-tier side Fortuna Sittard. In 2013, he was appointed assistant manager of  HSV in the German Bundesliga. He managed amateur team VV SCM from March 2015. In August 2015, Coumans was appointed assistant manager of Saudi Arabia. In 2018, he was appointed assistant manager of the Australia.

In 2020, he was appointed assistant manager of the United Arab Emirates. In 2022, Coumans was appointed manager of Saudi Arabian club Al-Hazem.

On 30 October 2022, Coumans was appointed as Abha's manager.

Managerial statistics

References

External links
 

1970 births
Living people
People from Meerssen
Sportspeople from Limburg (Netherlands)
Dutch football managers
Dutch expatriate football managers
Dutch expatriate sportspeople in Australia
Dutch expatriate sportspeople in Germany
Dutch expatriate sportspeople in Saudi Arabia
Dutch expatriate sportspeople in the United Arab Emirates
Expatriate football managers in Germany
Expatriate football managers in Saudi Arabia
Expatriate football managers in the United Arab Emirates
Expatriate soccer managers in Australia
Fortuna Sittard non-playing staff
Hamburger SV non-playing staff
Saudi Professional League managers
Al-Hazm FC managers
Abha Club managers